Mariana de Jesús Mendieta (born 10 April 1956) is an Ecuadorian politician. She was the first woman to hold the mayoralty of Durán.

Biography
Mariana Mendieta was born in Chone, Ecuador, on 10 April 1956. After the deaths of both men, she left the Radical Liberals and joined the Social Christian Party. In 1998, she was elected to the City Council of Durán. During her inauguration, Mendieta was attacked by assailants she identified as being supporters of incumbent mayor Oswaldo Peñaherrera, a member of the Ecuadorian Roldosist Party. She was so badly beaten that she had to abort her pregnancy at that time and developed a colostomy. Mendieta was dismissed from her position following a controversy wherein, during a cantonal meeting, she stripped off her pants and underwear to display her colostomy bag and accuse Mayor Peñaherrera of orchestrating the attack. She was restored to her seat by the Constitutional Court.

Her mayoralty was focused on the maintenance of roads and parks.

In July 2007, Mendieta was accused of embezzlement over alleged administrative irregularities.

Private life
Two of her children are Elina Narváez and Dalton Narváez Mendieta. Dalton also became mayor while Elina is a member of the National Assembly from March 2022.

Citations

1956 births
Living people
Women mayors of places in Ecuador
Social Christian Party (Ecuador) politicians
21st-century Ecuadorian women politicians
21st-century Ecuadorian politicians